In enzymology, an aliphatic nitrilase also known as  aliphatic nitrile aminohydrolase is an enzyme that catalyzes the hydrolysis of nitriles to carboxylic acids:

R-CN + 2 H2O  R-COOH + NH3

Thus, the two substrates of this enzyme are an aliphatic nitrile (R-CN) and H2O, whereas its two products are a carboxylic acid (R-COOH) and NH3.

This enzyme belongs to the family of hydrolases, those acting on carbon-nitrogen bonds other than peptide bonds, specifically in nitriles.  This enzyme participates in styrene degradation.

References

* 
 

EC 3.5.5
Enzymes of unknown structure